Gofasia is a genus of minute sea snails, marine gastropod mollusks or micromollusks in the family Rissoidae.

Species
Species within the genus Gofasia include:

 Gofasia atlantidis Gofas, 2007
 Gofasia galiciae Bouchet & Warén, 1993
 Gofasia josephinae Bouchet & Warén, 1993
 Gofasia obtusellaeformis Gofas, 2007
 Gofasia tenuicula Gofas, 2007
 Gofasia vanderlandi Bouchet & Warén, 1993
 Gofasia vinyllina Gofas, 2007

References

Rissoidae